Fire Records is a British independent record label, run by James Nicholls, with offices in London, England and New York, United States.  The label was founded by music journalist Johnny Waller and Clive Solomon in 1985 and released early records from Pulp, Teenage Fanclub (on subsidiary label Paperhouse), Spacemen 3 (formerly on Glass Records), Blue Aeroplanes, Lives of Angels and others. In the early 1990s, the label was home to Neutral Milk Hotel, The Lemonheads, Built to Spill, Urge Overkill and others. 
The label was relaunched in the late 1990s by James Nicholls, and has gone on to release albums by Guided By Voices, Giant Sand, Pere Ubu, Black Lips, Jane Weaver, Josephine Foster and The Lemonheads.

Roster
Current
Bardo Pond
Bark Psychosis
The Bevis Frond
The Chills
Death And Vanilla
The Groundhogs
Josephine Foster
Howe Gelb
Kristin Hersh
Las Kellies
Marina Allen
Marta Del Grandi
Modern Studies
Noveller
Orchestra Of Spheres
Pere Ubu
Pictish Trail
Rats On Rafts
Scott & Charlene's Wedding
Throwing Muses
Virginia Wing
Jane Weaver

Former
Archers of Loaf
Bailter Space
Atlantica
The Badgeman
Blank Realm
Blue Aeroplanes
Boston Spaceships
Cardinal
Chuck
 Dave Cloud & The Gospel of Power
Ned Collette + Wirewalker
Congregation
Bobby Conn
Cottonmouth
Danielson
Richard Davies
Delicate AWOL
Ryan Driver
ESG
Everclear
The Farm
Fitz of Depression
The Garbage and the Flowers
Duke Garwood
Giant Sand
Gigolo Aunts
Guided By Voices
Gun Club
Half Japanese
Harbourkings
Hospitality
HTRK
Jackie O Motherfucker
Libido
Lives of Angels
Lower Plenty
Manifesto
Mega City Four
Mission of Burma
Tom Morgan
AC Newman
The Nightblooms
Novocaine
Opossom
The Parachute Men
Pulp
Robert Pollard
Chuck Prophet
Rocket From The Tombs
The Rose of Avalanche
Sammy
Mathew Sawyer and The Ghosts
Scraps
The Servants
Sign Language
Silver Chapter
Spacemen 3
Supermodel
Surf City
Tells
Telstar Ponies
Tenebrous Liar
Thrum
The Times
Variety Lights
Virgin Passages
Wooden Wand

See also
 List of independent record labels

References

External links
Official Fire Records website

British independent record labels
Record labels established in 1986
Indie rock record labels
Alternative rock record labels
1986 establishments in the United Kingdom